Benn's Walk in Richmond, London, consists of five (originally six) almshouses, built in 1983 and now managed by The Richmond Charities. They were built on the site of Benn's Cottages, which had been developed on land endowed by William Smithet in 1727 to the charity that was then administering Michel's Almshouses.

See also
List of almshouses in the United Kingdom

Notes and references

External links
Official website
The Vineyard, Richmond: History of Michel's Almshouses

1983 establishments in England
Almshouses in Richmond, London
History of the London Borough of Richmond upon Thames
Residential buildings completed in 1983